Janet Sarbanes is an author and a professor of creative writing and cultural studies. Her books Army of One and The Protester Has Been Released are collections of short fiction. Her book Letters on the Autonomy Project is a collection of essays exploring the relation between art and politics via the concept of autonomy. She has published numerous essays on art, aesthetics, pedagogy and communal practice.

Education 
Sarbanes received her B.A. in comparative literature from Princeton and her PhD in English from UCLA. As a Princeton undergraduate, she spearheaded a successful effort to make the words of the school's alma mater gender inclusive.

Career 
Sarbanes teaches creative writing and cultural studies at the California Institute of the Arts.

Books and Notable Essays

Letters on the Autonomy Project 
Letters on the Autonomy Project was published by punctum books in June 2022.

The Protester Has Been Released 
The Protester Has Been Released is a collection of ten short stories and one novella. It was published by C&R Press in April 2017.

Army of One 
Army of One was published by Otis Press Seismicity Editions in Los Angeles.

"The Shaker 'Gift' Economy" 
Sarbanes received the Eugene Battisti Award from the Society for Utopian Studies for her essay "The Shaker 'Gift'Economy: Charisma, Aesthetic Practice and Utopian Communalism."

“Reframing the House of Dust” 
Sarbanes received the Creative Capital | Andy Warhol Foundation Arts Writers Grant for her essay project “Reframing the House of Dust: A Meditation in Many Parts.”

Personal life 
Sarbanes lives in Los Angeles. Her father is former Maryland U.S. Senator Paul Sarbanes and her brother is U.S. Representative John Sarbanes.

References 

American women short story writers
21st-century American short story writers
21st-century American women writers
Year of birth missing (living people)
Living people